Chandler Ruel Cowles (September 29, 1917 – February 1, 1997) was an American actor, producer, and co-producer in at least eleven New York theatrical productions from 1946 through 1960.

Early life 
Cowles was born in 1917 in New Haven, Connecticut.

Career 
Cowles collaborated closely with Gian-Carlo Menotti and Efrem Zimbalist Jr. on many of these and also was a lifelong friend of ballet legend George Balanchine, with whom he worked on the 1947 Broadway production of The Telephone/The Medium. He also wrote the 1983 television program I, Leonardo: A Journey of the Mind.

Personal life and death 
He was the father of actor Matthew Cowles.

Chandler Cowles died in 1997 in Manhattan, New York City, at the age of 79. He was buried in Lakeview Cemetery in Westmore, Vermont.

References

External links 
 
 

American theatre managers and producers
Place of death missing
Male actors from New Haven, Connecticut
1917 births
1997 deaths
20th-century American actors
Burials in Vermont
Writers from New Haven, Connecticut
American television writers
20th-century American screenwriters